Philip Charig (August 31, 1902 – July 21, 1960) was a composer and lyricist for plays in New York and London. He wrote Follow the Girls and others.

Musicals
 Yes, Yes, Yvette (1927); music also by Ben Jerome
 Just Fancy (1927); music also by Joseph Meyer
 That's a Good Girl (1928); music also by Joseph Meyer
 Polly (1929); music also by Herbert Stothart
 Sweet and Low (1930); music also by others
 Stand Up and Sing (1931)
 Nikki (1931)
 Artists and Models of 1943 (1943); music and lyrics by Phil Charig; music also by  Dan Shapiro, Milton Pascal
 Follow the Girls (1944); music and lyrics by Phil Charig; music also by Dan Shapiro, Milton Pascal
 Catch a Star! (1955); music also by Sammy Fain

References

External links
 

American musical theatre lyricists
American musical theatre composers
1902 births
1960 deaths
20th-century American composers